

Belgium
 Belgian Congo – Léon Pétillon, Governor-General of Belgian Congo (1952–1958)

France
 French Somaliland – René Petitbon, Governor of French Somaliland (1954–1957)
 Guinea – 
 Charles-Henri Bonfils, Governor of Guinea (1955–1956)
 Jean Paul Ramadier, Governor of Guinea (1956–1958)

Portugal
 Angola – 
 Manoel de Gusmão Mascarenhas Gaivão, High Commissioner of Angola (1955–1956)
 Horácio José de Sá Viana Rebelo, High Commissioner of Angola (1956–1960)

United Kingdom
 Aden – 
 Sir Tom Hickinbotham, Governor of Aden (1951–1956)
 Sir William Henry Tucker Luce, Governor of Aden (1956–1960)
 Malta Colony – Sir Robert Laycock, Governor of Malta (1954–1959)
 Northern Rhodesia – Sir Arthur Benson, Governor of Northern Rhodesia (1954–1959)

Colonial governors
Colonial governors
1956